Zhu Qianzhi (1899–1972) was a Chinese intellectual, translator and historian.

References
 Xu, Kangsheng, "Zhu Qianzhi". Encyclopedia of China, 1st ed.

1899 births
1972 deaths
Chinese anarchists
Republic of China historians
People's Republic of China historians
Republic of China philosophers
Peking University alumni
Academic staff of Peking University
National Sun Yat-sen University alumni
Writers from Fuzhou
Historians from Fujian
Republic of China translators
People's Republic of China translators
Educators from Fujian
Republic of China Buddhist monks
Academic staff of Sun Yat-sen University
People's Republic of China philosophers
Philosophers from Fujian
Academic staff of Jinan University
20th-century Chinese translators
20th-century Chinese historians
20th-century Buddhist monks